The Fletcher FU-24 is an agricultural aircraft made in New Zealand. One of the first aircraft designed for aerial topdressing, the Fletcher has also been used for other aerial applications as a utility aircraft, and for sky diving.

Design and development
In the early 1950s New Zealand topdressing operators were in the U.S. seeking a replacement for war surplus De Havilland Tiger Moths which formed the backbone of the industry. To answer the New Zealand request US aeronautical engineer and light aircraft enthusiast John W. Thorp, working for the Fletcher Aviation Corporation, conceived the T.15 with design elements taken from his earlier T.11 Sky Scooter including an all-moving horizontal tailplane but with a wing design similar to that of his Fletcher FD-25 Defender. Further design work was carried out by Gerald Barden of the Fletcher Aviation Corporation under Thorp's direction. A group of New Zealand top dressing operators gathered a hundred purchase options for the design, now marketed as the Fletcher FU-24, off the drawing board and New Zealand farming company Cable Price Corporation funded the construction of two prototypes (one for static stress tests which never received a constructor's number and the second, c/n1, to fly) in the U.S. with the New Zealand Meat Producers Board acting as financial guarantor.

The Fletcher is a conventional low-wing monoplane with tricycle undercarriage, side-by-side seating in front of the wing and hopper and pronounced dihedral on the outer wing panels. A door aft of the wing's trailing edge on the port side allows access to a cargo compartment. The Fletcher's airframe is constructed entirely of aluminium, heavily treated to prevent corrosion.

FU-24 c/n1 flew on 14 June 1954 in the United States as N6505C, then was disassembled for shipment to New Zealand where it flew as ZK-BDS. This original prototype had a  engine and open cockpit.  Prior to production commencing the design was altered to add an enclosed cockpit and more powerful 260 to  Continental engines.

The next 70 aircraft were delivered to New Zealand in kit form and assembled at Hamilton airport by operator James Aviation and later at Tasman Empire Airways Limited's Mechanics Bay factory under contract from a new firm, Air Parts (NZ) Limited. From 1961 full production was undertaken locally by Air Parts which later became part of AESL. It was during Air Parts' production that detail improvements and the option of dual controls were added, becoming the FU-24 Mark II.

After the 257th aircraft the engine was changed to a  Lycoming IO-720 horizontally-opposed eight-cylinder engine (over a hundred earlier aircraft were re-built and re-engined by the factory). In 1967 a PT6 turboprop version was built by James Aviation as ZK-CTZ, a  Garrett TPE 331-powered version followed in 1968 and a  Garrett-powered version in 1971, both for Robertson Air Service. Several others were converted aftermarket with these or Walter turbines, (including the first prototype, which flew until recently with a Walter). Two aircraft were also converted to Garrett TPE 331-10 engines by the Scone (NSW Australia) operator Airpasture. These aircraft have since flown many thousands of hours without incident.

In the mid 1990s operator Fieldair experimented with a turbocharged small block Chevrolet 402 V-8 producing 550 hp, although the project was cancelled before it flew, and in the early 2000s Super Air flew a Fletcher powered by a 550 hp Ford V-8 diesel which was replaced by a Walter turbine after trials were completed. In 2018 another Fletcher was fitted with a RED A03/V12 diesel engine and trials are ongoing as of 2022.

At least nineteen different engines have been fitted to the Fletcher.

In the mid 1970s, Pacific Aerospace decided the Fletcher design was reaching the limits of redevelopment and introduced the  larger and stronger PAC Cresco. Despite the similar appearance this is a new aircraft, though sharing a few components. For several years production of the two continued side by side, but the type is now effectively out of production, (new Fletchers remain nominally available from the manufacturer, but no new aircraft have been built since a batch of five for Syria was completed in 1992).

Although Fletcher was the name of the manufacturer in the U.S. and the aircraft was called the FU-24, over time the type has become colloquially known as the Fletcher.

Fletchers have been sold to most parts of the world, although they are rare in Europe and the US. Government orders came from many developing countries including Iraq, Sudan, Syria and Thailand.

Variants
 FU-24 : Single-seat agricultural top dressing aircraft.
 FU-24A Utility : Six-seat utility transport aircraft. One prototype built in the United States.
 FU-24-1060 : James Aviation turbine conversion with a 500 hp Pratt & Whitney Canada PT6A-20. One built.
 FU-24-1160 : Robertson Air Service turbine conversion with a 530 hp Garrett TPE331-57A. One built.
 FU-24-1284 : Robertson Air Service turbine conversion with a 665 hp Garrett TPE331-101A. One built.
 FU-24-950 : Two-seat agricultural top dressing aircraft. Also known as the Task Master in the United States.
 FU-24-954 : Improved version of the -954.
 Pegasus 1 : proposed military version developed by Frontier Aerospace, of Long Beach, California, not built.
 Fletcher Falcon : Wanganui Aero Work conversion with Lycoming LTP101 engine and Cresco wing and main landing gear. One built.
 Fletcher FU24-550GT Crusader : Flight Care of Napier conversion fitted with 550 hp Pratt & Whitney PT6A-15AG. One built.

Operators

 Mount Cook Airline

Surviving aircraft

As of February 2022 36 Fletchers are listed on the New Zealand civil aircraft register, and 19 in Australia. One example, c/n78 ZK-BYC, is maintained by a private owner as an airworthy heritage aircraft in New Zealand.

Three examples are held by aviation museums in New Zealand:
 c/n 72 ZK-BWV is under restoration for display by the Gisborne Aviation Preservation Society after having been used as a gate guardian for several years at Gisborne Airport
 c/n 124 ZK-CRY is on display at Classic Flyers NZ in Tauranga painted as ZK-BDS
 c/n 1001 ZK-CTZ, the first turbine-powered Fletcher, is on display at the Museum of Transport and Technology in Auckland

Additionally the remains of c/n 87 ZK-CBG are held for future static restoration by a private owner in Whanganui and the cockpit section of c/n100 ZK-CKA is being restored for use as a flight simulator by a private owner in Blenheim.

Specifications (FU-24-954)

See also

Notes

References
 Alexander, G. & J. S. Tullett, The Super Men. A.H. & A.W. Reed, Wellington, 1967
 Ewing, Ross and MacPherson, Ross. The History of New Zealand Aviation, Heinemann, 1986
 Geelen, Janic. The Topdressers NZ Aviation Press. Te Awamutu, 1983
 Knowles, Alan. New Zealand Aircraft, IPL Books, Wellington, 1990
 Lambert, Mark. Jane's All The World's Aircraft 1993–94. Coulsdon, UK:Jane's Data Division, 1993. .
 Taylor, John W. R. Jane's All The World's Aircraft 1965–66. London:Sampson Low, Marston & Company, 1965.
 Wood, Dereck, Janes World Aircraft Recognition Handbook, Jane's Publishing Company, London, 1982

External links

 Manufacturer's web site
 
 Fletcher page at Kiwi Aircraft images

Fletcher
1950s New Zealand agricultural aircraft
Single-engined tractor aircraft
Low-wing aircraft
Aircraft first flown in 1954